Many Neo-pagan religions such as Wicca, Druidry and Celtic Polytheism have active followings in Ireland, although the number of declared adherents is likely quite small.

Prior to 1990, Neo-pagan groups in Ireland tended to be regarded as eccentrics; however since then their profile has risen considerably. This is due to several reasons. The decline in influence of the Catholic church has prompted many to explore other belief systems. Discoveries of previously unknown astronomical alignments at stone circles, mountains and burial sites have indicated that the ancient Irish were more technologically advanced than previously thought.

Extensive road and motorway development since the mid-1990s has endangered several Celtic heritage sites, and Neo-pagan groups have frequently been involved in protests against these works. The highest-profile protests were against the proposed M3 motorway, which cuts through the Tara-Skryne or Gabhra valley in County Meath and close to the Hill of Tara, the traditional seat of the High Kings of Ireland. Druidic groups in particular have been heavily involved in protesting the motorway's development.

In addition, Pagan Federation Ireland achieved a notable victory when their campaigning resulted in Pagan celebrants winning the right to conduct legally-binding Pagan weddings.  Pagan celebrants can gain their licence to conduct such weddings in a variety of ways, the two most common being through membership and certification through Pagan Federation Ireland, or membership and certification through an organisation known as Pagan Life Rites.

Wicca in Ireland

A number of Wiccan temples and covens exist in Ireland.

Teampall Na Calliaghe based in Kells, Co. Meath is run by Janet Farrar and Gavin Bone; who have also published a number of books on Wicca.

Author Lora O'Brien, who has published works specifically dealing with witchcraft in Ireland  is not involved in Wicca anymore, but now runs a monthly moot (a social and networking meeting) in County Waterford

Druidry in Ireland

There are a number of well-established Druidic groups in Ireland:
 The Irish College of Druids
 Ireland's Druid School based in Castlerea, County Roscommon represents "a spiritual path connecting the three realms and the three cauldrons with natural time and may not be seen as a religion"
Eimear Burke, who in 2020 took up the role of Chosen chief of OBOD (The Order of Bards, Ovates and Druids) resides in Kilkenny, and runs The Kilkenny Druid Grove.

The Irish Druid Network website is a useful source for news and maintains a comprehensive list of Druidic schools, groves and other resources, founded by Luke Eastwood and Wil Kinghan.

Neo-Pagan events in Ireland

The Eigse Spiorad Cheilteach (Celtic Spirit Festival) has been held every year for the last 9 years, and features speakers, rituals and a night Court (an open space for sharing poetry, song and other creative works). Founded by Luke Eastwood, it is now under the stewardship of Anna Ní Cút, Paul O'Corcoran and Eimear Burke.

See also
Neopaganism in the United Kingdom

References

Religion in the Republic of Ireland
Ireland
Ireland